Butler Nunataks are a small group of nunataks immediately north of Mount Twintop in the Framnes Mountains. The group was mapped from Australian National Antarctic Research Expeditions surveys of 1954–62, and named by the Antarctic Names Committee of Australia for W.J. Butler, senior diesel mechanic at Mawson Station in 1967.

References
 

Nunataks of Mac. Robertson Land